An almucantar (also spelled almucantarat or almacantara) is a circle on the celestial sphere parallel to the horizon. Two stars that lie on the same almucantar have the same altitude. 

Almucantar staff

An almucantar staff is an instrument chiefly used to determine the time of sunrise and sunset, in order to find the amplitude and consequently the variations of the compass.  Usually made of pear tree or boxwood, with an arch of 15° to 30°, it is an example of a backstaff.

The sun casts that shadow of a vane (B in the adjacent image) on a horizon vane (A).  The horizon vane has a slit or hole to allow the observer to see the horizon in the distance.  The observer aligns the horizon and shadow so they show at the same point on the horizon vane and sets the sighting vane (C) to align his line of sight with the horizon.  The altitude of the sun is the angle between the shadow vane and the sighting vane (B-A-C).

Solar almucantar
The almucantar plane that contains the Sun is used to characterize multiple scattering of aerosols. Measurements are carried out rapidly at several angles at both sides of the Sun using a spectroradiometer or a photometer. There are several models to obtain aerosol properties from the solar almucantar. The most relevant were developed by Oleg Dubovik and used in the NASA AERONET network and by Teruyuki Nakajima (named SkyRad.pack).

See also
Circle of equal altitude

References

Adelaide Observatory: Almucantar graphs of hour angles, Adelaide, R. E. E. Rogers, Govt. printer, 1927.
Chandler, Seth Carlo, (1846–1913): The almucantar, Cambridge, J. Wilson and Son, 1887.
Dubovik, O. and M. D. King, 2000: A flexible inversion algorithm for retrieval of aerosol optical properties from Sun and sky radiance measurements," Journal of Geophysical Research, 105, 20 673-20 696   pdf version
Nakajima T, Tonna G, Rao RZ, et al.:Use of sky brightness measurements from ground for remote sensing of particulate polydispersions, Applied Optics 35 (15), 2672–2686, 1996

External links
"Compendium on Using the Device Known as the Almucantar Quarter" is an Arabic manuscript from 1757 about the Almucantar Quarter

Astronomical coordinate systems
Measuring instruments
Astronomical instruments
Navigational equipment
Celestial navigation
Historical scientific instruments